Catherine Glesca Marshall (September 19, 1906 – August 21, 1987) was an actress and theatrical benefactor who was known primarily as the most enduring lover of Alla Nazimova, silent screen actress and a legend of her time.  Glesca met Nazimova when both were cast in a production at the Civic Repertory Theater.

Glesca later lived with Nazimova at the Garden of Allah Hotel on Sunset Boulevard near the Sunset Strip in Hollywood. In the silent film era, the hotel had been an estate that was Nazimova's home. Glesca lived there in a villa on the grounds until Nazimova's death in 1945.

Glesca was also the longtime companion of Emily Woodruff, theatrical benefactor and main patron of the Springer Opera House in Columbus, Georgia. Emily was married to Hume Cronyn, though they never lived together and Emily insisted the marriage remain a secret. Marshall and Woodruff are buried together at Parkhill Cemetery, Columbus, Georgia.

External links 

latimes.com

</ref>

American film actresses
Bisexual actresses
Bisexual women
American LGBT actors
1906 births
1987 deaths
20th-century American actresses
20th-century American LGBT people